Yoga Narendra Malla, also known as Yoganarendra, (Nepali: योगनरेन्द्र मल्ल) was a Malla dynasty king and the King of Patan. He was the son of Srinivasa Malla and reigned on Patan from 1685 until his death in 1705.

Early life 
Yoganarendra was involved in administrating the kingdom from his early age because of his father. However, his relationships with the local feudal lords soon began to deteriorate especially against a person named Bhagirath Bhaiya. Yoganarendra also indulged himself in illicit activities which caused his father to abdicate so that Yoganarendra would be busy ruling the kingdom.

Reign 
Srinivasa Malla abdicated in 1685 and Yoganaraendra was crowned as the king in December of the same year. He began to get rid of his enemies and had Bhagirath Bhaiya murdered in 1690. He had a minister named Vamsidhara, who belonged to one of the feudal lords who ruled Patan.

Skirmishes with Kantipur and Bhadgaon 
During the reign of Yoganarendra Malla, numerous skirmeshes occurred with the neighboring kingdoms of Kantipur and Bhadgaon. In around 1688, due to the influence of a minister named Lakshminarayan, Patan sided with Kantipur and strengthened the blockade imposed to Bhadgaon. In 1689, Patan switched sides and attacked Kantipur jointly with Bhadgaon and the next year it waged a battle against both Kantipur and Bhadgaon on its own. Lakshminarayan was assassinated in 1690 and the disputes halted for a while. Minor battles also happened between the three kingdoms in 1696 and 1697.

Succession 
Yoganarendra had no legitimate heirs when he died and thus a period of political instability began in Patan which lasted for ten years. The feudal lords of Patan first installed Lokaprakash Malla, grandson of Yoganarendra through his daughter, as the King. Lokaprakash died of smallpox only after eleven months of reign and was succeeded by Indra Malla, the son of Yoganarendra's sister Manimati.

Personal life 
Like his ancestors, Yoganarendra also was a religious monarch. He reformed many religious activities and also set up an image of Bhima killing Dushasana. He was poisoned to death by an agent of Bhadgaon while he was directing an attack against it in 1705. At least 21 queens and concubines of him went Sati.

References 

17th-century Nepalese people
Nepalese monarchs
1667 births
1705 deaths